The St. Andrew School (also known as the St. Andrew Grammar School) is a historic site in Panama City, Florida. It is located at 3001 West 15th Street. On August 14, 1997, it was added to the U.S. National Register of Historic Places.  It was constructed in 1926 and served as a Bay County school until Hurricane Michael left the school beyond a financially profitable state of disrepair.

References

External links
 Bay County listings at National Register of Historic Places

Buildings and structures in Panama City, Florida
National Register of Historic Places in Bay County, Florida
School buildings on the National Register of Historic Places in Florida